Sharon Joseph, is an Indian playback singer from Kerala who sings in six languages: Malayalam, Tamil, Telugu, Hindi, Marathi and English. She started her career as a playback singer in the Malayalam movie Hangover in 2014.

Personal life
Sharon was born to a Roman Catholic Syrian Christian family from Kottayam, Kerala on 17 July 1989. She has been born and brought up in Pune, Maharashtra. She started learning Carnatic music at the age of 4 under Mrs. Meenakshi Subramanian. In the year 2013, she was married to Dr. Joseph George who is the Head of the Department – Commerce at Sacred Heart College, Thevara. It was the inspiration and support from her husband and her present family, that encouraged her to take up singing as her full-time profession. They have a daughter Rebecca and are settled in Kochi, Kerala.

Career

Before stepping into her full-time Music Career, Sharon was working in Pune with Suzlon, until the time she got married. A Post graduate in Business Administration, Sharon debuted as a playback singer in 2014 with the song Vellithingal a duet opposite Najim Arshad in debutant Sreejith Sukumaran's Malayalam film Hangover under music director Mejo Joseph. She has also played back in Tamil, Telugu and Marathi, for movies, that await their release. She is also a vocalist and lyricist for several Ad Films in Malayalam, Hindi and English. She has sung for a number of Christian and Hindu Devotional Albums, the first one being cut, when she was aged 10.

She went on to debut as a Lyricist in Hindi with Priyadarshan's Oppam starring Mohanlal for the song Pala Naalaayi and also lent vocals for the same in 2016. She has also sung a duet Sisira Vaanil alongside Musical Maestro K. J. Yesudas for the movie Chinna Dada in the same year.

Discography

Films

Ad films

Albums

References

 
 
 
 
 
 
 
 

Malayalam playback singers
Living people
1989 births
Indian lyricists
Indian women playback singers
Telugu playback singers
Bollywood playback singers
Marathi playback singers
21st-century Indian women singers
21st-century Indian singers
Singers from Kerala
Women musicians from Kerala
Artists from Kottayam